is a Japanese football player for Verspah Oita.

Club statistics
Updated to 23 February 2017.

References

External links

Profile at Fujieda MYFC

1994 births
Living people
Association football people from Kumamoto Prefecture
Japanese footballers
J2 League players
J3 League players
Japan Football League players
Roasso Kumamoto players
Gainare Tottori players
Fujieda MYFC players
Verspah Oita players
J.League U-22 Selection players
Association football defenders